Red Clay is an album recorded in 1970 by jazz trumpeter Freddie Hubbard. It was his first album on Creed Taylor's CTI label and marked a shift toward the soul-jazz fusion sounds that would dominate his recordings in the later part of the decade. It entered at number 20 on Billboard’s Top 20 Best Selling Jazz LPs, on June 20, 1970.

Reception
Bill Milkowski of JazzTimes commented "...Red Clay, an album that would not only define Hubbard’s direction over the next decade while setting the template for all future CTI recordings, but would also have a dramatic impact on a generation of trumpet players coming up in the ’70s. Red Clay would become Hubbard’s signature tune throughout his career." Thom Jurek of AllMusic stated "This may be Freddie Hubbard's finest moment as a leader, in that it embodies and utilizes all of his strengths as a composer, soloist, and frontman. On Red Clay, Hubbard combines hard bop's glorious blues-out past with the soulful innovations of mainstream jazz in the 1960s, and reads them through the chunky groove innovations of '70s jazz fusion... This is a classic, hands down." Tom Moon in 1,000 Recordings to Hear Before You Die wrote "Red Clay is one of those records that mucks up the neat evolution narrative of jazz."

Track listing
All compositions by Freddie Hubbard except where noted
"Red Clay" - 12:11
"Delphia" - 7:23
"Suite Sioux" - 8:38
"The Intrepid Fox" - 10:45
"Cold Turkey" (John Lennon) - 10:27 (recorded at original session - not released until CD issue)
"Red Clay" [Live] - 18:44 Bonus track on the 2001 and 2010 CD releases
Recorded at Van Gelder Studio, Englewood Cliffs, New Jersey, January 27–29, 1970 except track 6 recorded live at the Southgate Palace in Los Angeles on July 19, 1971.

Personnel
Freddie Hubbard - trumpet
Joe Henderson - tenor saxophone, flute (tracks 1-5)
Herbie Hancock - electric piano, Hammond organ (tracks 1-5)
Ron Carter - bass
Lenny White - drums (tracks 1-5)

Track 6 Additional Personnel
Stanley Turrentine - tenor saxophone
Johnny "Hammond" Smith - electric piano
George Benson - guitar
Billy Cobham - drums
Airto Moreira - percussion

References

Freddie Hubbard albums
1970 albums
Albums produced by Creed Taylor
CTI Records albums
Albums recorded at Van Gelder Studio
Hard bop albums